The Black Rock Desert–High Rock Canyon Emigrant Trails National Conservation Area is the federal land in northwestern Nevada, under the Bureau of Land Management-BLM management and protection, and the ten Wilderness Areas within it.

The long name has led people to often shorten it to the Black Rock–High Rock NCA, when not needing the official name. The protected areas were created by the Black Rock Desert–High Rock Canyon Emigrant Trails National Conservation Area Act of 2000.

Recreation
The Black Rock–High Rock Conservation Area allows recreational uses, and motorized vehicle travel on trails and playas only, while managing the area to preserve the natural habitats, historic emigrant trails, and the natural landmarks of the Black Rock Desert and High Rock Canyon. Many activities, such as with a large group of people, require a BLM permit. Motorized vehicle travel is not permitted in the Wilderness Areas, to protect the animals and plant communities within them. Walking and hiking are encouraged.

Information 
The BLM office has online and printed maps and information, with the boundaries and features of the Black Rock–High Rock NCA and of the locations of the ten designated National Wilderness Preservation Areas located within the NCA. There are the BLM Winnemucca office in Winnemucca, Nevada and the BLM Surprise Valley office in Cedarville, California.
Information is also available from The Friends of Black Rock High Rock, a 501(c)(3) organization, which helps manage the resources of the Black Rock Desert and High Rock regions, educates the public to foster stewardship and preserve its unique character, and sponsors events to enjoy it.

Wilderness areas
The National Wilderness Preservation Areas in the Black Rock Desert – High Rock Canyon Emigrant Trails National Conservation Area include:
Calico Mountains Wilderness
Black Rock Desert Wilderness
East Fork High Rock Canyon Wilderness
High Rock Canyon Wilderness
High Rock Lake Wilderness
Little High Rock Canyon Wilderness
North Black Rock Range Wilderness
North Jackson Mountains Wilderness
Pahute Peak Wilderness
South Jackson Mountains Wilderness

See also
Applegate Trail
Black Rock Desert
List of wilderness areas in Nevada

References

External links 
Black Rock Desert–High Rock Canyon Emigrant Trails National Conservation Area, from BLM Winnemucca office
Black Rock Desert–High Rock National Conservation Area, from BLM
Black Rock Desert-High Rock National NCA and Wilderness Areas map
The Friends of Black Rock-High Rock, blackrockdesert.org

Wilderness areas of Nevada
National Conservation Areas of the United States
Protected areas of Humboldt County, Nevada
Protected areas of Pershing County, Nevada
Protected areas of Washoe County, Nevada
Protected areas of Nevada
Bureau of Land Management areas in Nevada
Units of the National Landscape Conservation System
Protected areas established in 2000
2000 establishments in Nevada